Smithbrook may refer to:

 A hamlet part of Bramley, Surrey, England
A hamlet forming the north of Lodsworth, West Sussex, England